Eastern Railway Divisional Stadium or Loco Ground is a multi purpose stadium in Asansol, West Bengal. The ground is mainly used for organizing matches of football, cricket and other sports. The stadium has hosted a Ranji Trophy match in 1982 when Bengal cricket team played against Orissa cricket team but since then the stadium has hosted non-first-class matches.

References

External links 
 cricketarchive
 cricinfo

Defunct cricket grounds in India
Sports venues in West Bengal
Cricket grounds in West Bengal
Asansol
Sports venues completed in 1982
1982 establishments in West Bengal
Eastern Railway zone
20th-century architecture in India